Ergo Arena (Hala Gdańsk-Sopot) is a multi-purpose indoor arena, that was opened in 2010. The boundary between two cities – Sopot and Gdańsk – runs through the very middle of the hall. The arena has a capacity of 11,409 people, for sports events and up to 15,000, with standing places, for concerts.

History
The first major event in the hall took place on November 26, 2010, when Lady Gaga performed during The Monster Ball Tour, with Semi Precious Weapons as her opening act, to more than 12,000 people. 

Sport events, including the 2013 Men's European Volleyball Championship, 2014 IAAF World Indoor Championships and the 2014 FIVB Volleyball Men's World Championship, as well as a part of the 2016 European Men's Handball Championship were held at the arena.

For Athletics competition a six-lane, banked 200-meter oval is installed on the arena floor. According to an IAAF press release, the athletics track at the ERGO Arena, the venue for the 2014 IAAF World Indoor Championships, was officially opened for the 2014 season on Sunday 16 February. Italian company Mondo made the indoor portable banked track with a Mondo Super X rubberized surface (13.5mm thick). The surface was also used at both the 2008 and 2012 Summer Olympics.

Concerts 
List of artists:

 Ozzy Osbourne
 Rammstein
 Lady Gaga
 Roxette
 Erykah Badu
 Enrique Iglesias
 Jean-Michel Jarre
 Sting
 José Carreras
 Michael Bublé
 Chris Botti
 Iron Maiden
 Backstreet Boys
 30 Seconds to Mars
 Pet Shop Boys
 Judas Priest 
 Lenny Kravitz
 André Rieu
 Slipknot
 Hans Zimmer
 Andrea Bocelli
 Il Divo
 Dave Matthews Band
 Bryan Adams
 Maluma 
 Depeche Mode
 Scorpions
 Ricky Martin

Sport events 
 WWE Smackdown World Tour 2011
 WWE WrestleMania Revenge Tour 2012
 UFC Fight Night 118
 ACB 63
 2023 World Men's Handball Championship
 FAME MMA 5
 High League
 FAME MMA 12
 High League 3
 2021 Red Bull BC One
CAVALIADA Sopot 2022

Gallery

See also
List of indoor arenas in Poland
Sport in Poland

References

External links

Official website of Ergo Arena
Information for visitors
Arena from inside
Arena from outside
Arena by night

Indoor arenas in Poland
Sport in Gdańsk
Sport in Sopot
Buildings and structures in Sopot
Buildings and structures in Gdańsk
Tourist attractions in Gdańsk
Sports venues in Pomeranian Voivodeship
Basketball venues in Poland
Volleyball venues in Poland
Boxing venues in Poland
Mixed martial arts venues in Poland